Cappagh may refer to:

Northern Ireland, UK
Cappagh, County Armagh, a townland in County Armagh
Cappagh, County Down, a townland in County Down
Cappagh, County Tyrone, a townland, village and civil parish in County Tyrone

Republic of Ireland
Cappagh, County Carlow, a townland in County Carlow
Cappagh, County Cavan, a townland in County Cavan
Cappagh, County Clare, townlands in County Clare
Cappagh, County Cork, townlands in County Cork
Cappagh, County Donegal, a townland in County Donegal
Cappagh, County Dublin, a townland in County Dublin
Cappagh, County Galway, townlands in County Galway
Cappagh, County Kerry, townlands in County Kerry
Cappagh, County Kildare, a townland in County Kildare
Cappagh, County Kilkenny, townlands in County Kilkenny
Cappagh, County Limerick, a parish in County Limerick
Cappagh, County Waterford
Cappagh, County Westmeath, a townland in Lackan civil parish
Cappagh GAA, a Gaelic Athletic Association club in County Kildare